Paul Fennell is a male retired British cyclist.

Cycling career
He represented England in the 10 miles scratch race, the 1 Km time trial and the 4,000 metres team pursuit, at the 1978 Commonwealth Games in Edmonton, Alberta, Canada and was part of the bronze medal pursuit winning team that consisted of Tony James, Tony Doyle and Glen Mitchell.

He won one National Championship in 1974.

References

Living people
British male cyclists
Commonwealth Games medallists in cycling
Commonwealth Games bronze medallists for England
Cyclists at the 1978 Commonwealth Games
Year of birth missing (living people)
20th-century British people
Medallists at the 1978 Commonwealth Games